The Algerian wall gecko (Tarentola neglecta) is a species of lizard in the family Phyllodactylidae. It is found in Algeria, Tunisia, and possibly Libya. This gecko lives in vegetation in dry areas such as deserts. It has also been found in abandoned buildings. It is locally common with no major threats.

References

Tarentola
Geckos of Africa
Reptiles of North Africa
Reptiles described in 1887
Taxonomy articles created by Polbot